Anders Järryd was the defending champion of the singles event at the CA-TennisTrophy tennis tournament but lost in the quarterfinals to Michael Stich.

Stich won in the final 6–4, 6–4, 6–4 against Jan Siemerink.

Seeds

  Michael Stich (champion)
  Jakob Hlasek (second round)
  Petr Korda (semifinals)
  Goran Prpić (first round)
  Andrei Cherkasov (second round)
  Alexander Volkov (second round)
  Horst Skoff (quarterfinals)
  Anders Järryd (quarterfinals)

Draw

Final

Section 1

Section 2

External links
 ATP singles draw

Singles